"Till mitt eget Blue Hawaii" is a song written by Rose-Marie Stråhle, and recorded by Vikingarna on the 1990 album "Kramgoa låtar 18". With lyrics about Hawaii, it became a major Svensktoppen hit, staying at the chart for 23 weeks during the period 7 January-13 May 1990, and was atop of the chart for the first nine weeks. In October 1989, the song won "Hänts meloditävling".

Other recordings
A 1995 heavy metal version by Black-Ingvars, was on the album "Earcandy Six"  and released as a single that year. The single entered the charts, peaking at 3rd position in Sweden and 12th position in Norway.
A recording by Östen med Resten was on the band's 2001 cover album""Originallåtar", and in 2002 served as the B-side for the single "Hon kommer med solsken".
Bjørn Held wrote lyrics in Danish, also titled "Till mitt eget Blue Hawaii", which was recorded by Danish dansband Kandis on the 2004 album "Kandis live".
At Dansbandskampen 2008 the song was performed by Scotts. It was also on the 2008 Scotts album På vårt sätt.
At Dansbandskampen 2009 the song was performed by Von Hofstenz.
During a Dansbandskampen 2010 pause act, the song was performed by Gunhild Carling.

Charts

Black Ingvars version

References

1989 songs
1989 singles
1995 singles
Swedish songs
Swedish-language songs
Vikingarna (band) songs
Östen med Resten songs
Scotts (band) songs
Songs about Hawaii